Clypeostoma elongatum is a species of sea snails, a marine gastropod mollusc in the family Chilodontidae (formerly in the family Trochidae, the top snails).

Description
The size of the shell varies between 7 mm and 24 mm.

Distribution
This marine species occurs off the Philippines and Indonesia.

References

 Vilvens C. (2001). Description of a new species of Agathodonta (Gastropoda: Trochidae: Eucyclinae: Chilodontini) from Indonesia and the Philippine Islands. Novapex 2(2): 57-60 
  Herbert D.G. (2012) A revision of the Chilodontidae (Gastropoda: Vetigastropoda: Seguenzioidea) of southern Africa and the south-western Indian Ocean. African Invertebrates, 53(2): 381–502

External links
 

elongata
Gastropods described in 2001